The 3 Line (colored magenta) is a future light rail line in the Seattle metropolitan area in the U.S. state of Washington, to be part of Sound Transit's Link light rail system. It is planned to connect Everett and Snohomish County to Downtown Seattle and West Seattle. The 3 Line would share tracks with the 2 Line from southern Everett to International District/Chinatown station along the 1 Line corridor.

The line is planned to reuse existing tracks that are part of the 1 Line and its future expansions; the 1 Line will then be rerouted through a new Downtown Seattle tunnel to be built for the Ballard Link Extension. The  Everett Link Extension to the north of Lynnwood will have six stations and is scheduled to open between 2037 and 2041. The  West Seattle Link Extension will include three new stations southwest of SODO station and is scheduled to open in 2032. The 3 Line was created as part of the Sound Transit 3 program, approved by voters in 2016, which included both projects.

Stations
Names and locations for future stations are provisional.

References

External links
West Seattle Link Extension project page
Everett Link Extension project page

2032 in rail transport
Link light rail
Transportation in King County, Washington
Transportation in Snohomish County, Washington
Transportation in Seattle
1500 V DC railway electrification